Tom Brown at Oxford is a novel by Thomas Hughes, first published in serial form in Macmillan's Magazine in 1859. It was published in two volumes in book form in 1861. It is a sequel to the better-known Tom Brown's School Days.

The story follows the character of Tom Brown to fictional St Ambrose's College, Oxford. The novel offers a vivid impression of university life in the mid nineteenth century.

The book was out of print for many years but is available in Britain from Wordsworth Classics with 'Tom Brown's Schooldays' and is now available on the Project Gutenberg ebook site. Editions of the serialized form are available at from the Hathi Trust.

The illustrator Sydney Prior Hall (1842–1922), portrait painter and illustrator, was one of the leading reportage artists of the later Victorian period.

References

External links
 
National Portrait Gallery page on Sydney Prior Hall

1861 British novels
English novels
British young adult novels
19th-century British children's literature
Sequel novels
Novels by Thomas Hughes
Novels set in University of Oxford
Macmillan Publishers books
1860s children's books